KLOR-FM 99.3 FM is a radio station licensed to Ponca City, Oklahoma. The station broadcasts a classic hits format and is owned by Team Radio LLC.

References

External links
Official Website
KLOR-FM's profile at Team Radio's corporate website

LOR-FM
Classic hits radio stations in the United States